KXTE (107.5 MHz, X107-5) is a commercial FM radio station licensed to Pahrump, Nevada, and serving the Las Vegas metropolitan area. It is owned by the Beasley Broadcast Group and broadcasts a mix of hot talk and alternative rock.  It carries two nationally syndicated weekday programs, The Free Beer and Hot Wings Show from WGRD-FM Grand Rapids and Dave and Chuck The Freak from WRIF Detroit.  KXTE's studios are on South Durango Drive in Las Vegas. 

KXTE has an effective radiated power (ERP) of 24,500 watts.  Its transmitter is atop Potosi Mountain in Blue Diamond.  KXTE broadcasts using HD Radio technology.  Its HD-2 digital subchannel plays classic hits.

History

K-Love (1986-1988) 
KLVV began broadcasting in Las Vegas on the 107.5 frequency in April 1986.  It was an adult contemporary station calling itself "K-Love." (It was not connected with the current day Christian Contemporary network known as K-Love.)

Oldies 108 (1988-1992) 
In November 1988, the station, now owned by EZ Communications, became KUDA, "Oldies 108 FM." Norm N. Nite once had a show on the station, called Solid Gold Scrapbook. In 1989, KUDA was purchased by Americom Broadcasting, which owned stations in Reno and Fresno.

KFBI (1992-1996) 
Americom, headed by Tom Quinn, added Howard Stern’s show to the station in 1992, changed the station's call letters to KFBI and transitioned from oldies to classic rock in 1993. This was the first time Stern agreed to appear on a station outside of a top-10 radio market, and KFBI immediately surged to the top of ratings in Las Vegas, making KFBI the city's dominant radio station.

Alternative rock (1996-2022) 
Three years later, in April 1996, Americom sold KFBI to American Radio Systems (ARS), where PD Mike Stern and GM Alan Gray changed the call letters to KXTE, flipped the station's format to alternative rock, and rebranded the station as “X 107.5”. ARS later merged with Infinity Broadcasting (forerunner to CBS Radio).

Stern stayed on KXTE until the station pulled him in November 2005, a month before he left terrestrial radio for Sirius Satellite Radio. He was replaced by Adam Carolla, which began airing on January 3, 2006, and ended on February 20, 2009. Dave Farra and Jason Mahoney, hosts of The Dave and Mahoney Morning Show, returned to the Las Vegas airwaves to take over mornings on April 20, 2009. On August 3, 2015, it was announced that Dave and Mahoney would re-locate from Las Vegas to CBS Radio sister station KHMX in Houston. On January 15, 2017, it was announced that the show would return to KXTE starting February 6.

On February 2, 2017, CBS Radio announced it would merge with Entercom (now Audacy). The merger was approved on November 9, 2017, and was consummated on November 17.

On September 14, 2020, KXTE rebranded as Alt 107.5 as part of a nationwide expansion of networked programming and the Alt brand across Entercom's alternative stations. As part of this, KXTE program director and afternoon host Ross Mahoney was let go, while "Dave & Mahoney" remained in mornings and would be syndicated to San Diego sister station KBZT. In addition, KXTE would add KROQ Los Angeles host Nicole Alvarez for middays, KRBZ Kansas City's "Church of Lazlo" for afternoons, and WNYL New York's Kevan Kenney and Bryce Segall for nights and overnights, respectively. By mid-2022, the station had dropped most of the out of market programming and was being programmed locally again.

On October 6, 2022, it was announced that Audacy and Beasley Broadcast Group would swap a pair of stations in Las Vegas, with Audacy swapping ownership of KXTE to Beasley in exchange for KDWN. The company stated that the syndicated Dave & Mahoney show, based at KXTE, will remain on the station upon the closure of the deal. Beasley would begin operating the station through a local marketing agreement on November 14, at which time the station dismissed the entirety of the airstaff and began running jockless with limited imaging outside of Dave & Mahoney.

Hot talk (2022-present)
On December 19, 2022, KXTE returned to its prior X107.5 branding with the new slogan "Xtreme Radio", and changed its weekday lineup to focus on hot talk programs; Dave & Mahoney remains the station's morning/flagship show, and would be joined by the syndicated Free Beer and Hot Wings Show in middays, and Dave & Chuck the Freak from sister station WRIF in Detroit (which airs live in early mornings, and is replayed in afternoon drive). Alternative rock will continue to be featured during overnights and weekends.

Other appearances
Dave Farra's interview with cast members from the 2011 season of MTV reality television series, The Real World: Las Vegas, who were promoting their fundraiser for "Let the Kids Rock" to raise money for school children, was depicted in that season's finale, which premiered on June 1, 2011.

KXTE HD programming
KXTE-HD2 signed on its HD Radio programming in 2001 with X2, a deep tracks alternative format, then in 2010, flipped to an all-80s format branded as "Rewind". On January 22, 2014, KXTE-HD2 flipped to dance radio, branded as "SIN 107.5". “SIN” would later be replaced with a classic hits format, branded as “DLC Radio” and sponsored full-time by short-term loan provider Dollar Loan Center.

Previous logo

References

External links

XTE
Modern rock radio stations in the United States
Radio stations established in 1986
1986 establishments in Nevada